Vem tror du att du är? is the Swedish version of the British genealogy documentary series Who Do You Think You Are?

Episodes

Series 1 (spring 2009)
Helena Bergström
Thomas Bodström
Malin Berghagen
Suzanne Osten
Magnus Härenstam
Charlotte Perrelli

Series 2 (autumn 2009)
Claes Malmberg
Pia Johansson
Dogge Doggelito
Lotta Ramel
Ulf Adelsohn

Series 3 (autumn 2010)
 9/11 - Christer Sjögren
 16/11 - Liza Marklund
 23/11 - Tina Nordström
 30/11 - Ernst Billgren
 7/12 - Lotta Engberg

Series 4 (autumn 2011)
 6/9 - Lena Endre
 13/9 - Andreas Dregen
 20/9 - Måns Herngren
 27/9 - Caroline af Ugglas
 4/10 - Barbro "Lill-Babs" Svensson
 11/10 - Suzanne Reuter
 18/10 - Rikard Wolff
 25/10 - Thorsten Flinck

Series 5 (autumn 2012)
Participants:
 27/8 - Lasse Åberg
 3/9 - Petra Mede
 10/9 - Kalle Moraeus
 17/9 - Siw Malmkvist
 24/9 - Plura Jonsson
 1/10 - Camilla Läckberg
 8/10 - Mark Levengood

Series 6 (autumn 2013)
Participants:
 23/9 - Björn Skifs
 30/9 - Mia Skäringer
 7/10 - Peter Dalle
 14/10 -  Alexandra Rapaport
 21/10 - Johannes Brost
 28/10 - Maud Adams
 4/11 - Mårten Palme

Series 7 first half(autumn 2014)
Participants:
 25/8 - Örjan Ramberg
 1/9 - Eva Rydberg
 8/9 - Mikael Wiehe
 15/9 - Marie Richardson
 22/9 - Pernilla Wahlgren
 29/9 - Thomas Ravelli

Series 7 second half(spring 2015)
Participants:
 Örjan Ramberg
 Eva Rydberg
 Mikael Wiehe
 Marie Richardsson
 Thomas Ravelli
 Pernilla Wahlgren

Season 8
Participants:
 24/8 - Tomas Ledin
 31/8 - Amanda Ooms
 7/9 - Björn Kjellman
 14/9 - Ebbot Lundberg
 21/9 - Ebba von Sydow
 28/9 - Leif Andrée

Season 9 (2016)
Participants:
 29/8 - Leif Mannerström
 5/9 - Martina Haag
 12/9 - Lennart Jähkel
 19/9 - Eva Röse
 26/9 - Stefan Holm
 3/10 - Ewa Fröling

Season 10 (2021)
Participants:  
1/9 - Felix Herngren and Linnea Henriksson
8/9 - Felix Herngren and Carolina Gynning
Johan Ulveson, Markus Aujalay and Maria Lundqvist

References

External links
 *Vem tror du att du är at SVT

Sveriges Television original programming
2009 Swedish television series debuts
Television series about family history
2000s Swedish television series